The Hunza Valley is a mountainous valley in the northern part of the Gilgit-Baltistan region of Pakistan, formed by the Hunza River, bordering Ishkoman to the northwest, Shigar to the southeast, Afghanistan's Wakhan Corridor to the north, and the Xinjiang region of China to the northeast.

Geography
The Hunza Valley is a mountainous valley in the northern part of the Gilgit-Baltistan region of Pakistan, formed by the Hunza River, bordering Ishkoman to the northwest, Shigar to the southeast, Afghanistan's Wakhan Corridor to the north and the Xinjiang region of China to the northeast. The Hunza Valley floor is at an elevation of 2,438 meters (7,999 feet). Geographically, the Hunza Valley consists of three regions: Upper Hunza (Gojal), Central Hunza, and Lower Hunza (Shinaki).

History 

Buddhism, and to a lesser extent, Bön, were the main religions in the area. The region has several surviving Buddhist archaeological sites, such as the Sacred Rock of Hunza. Nearby are former sites of Buddhist shelters. Hunza valley was central as a trading route from Central Asia to the subcontinent. It also provided protection to Buddhist missionaries and monks visiting the subcontinent, and the region played a significant role in the transmission of Buddhism throughout Asia.

The region was a Buddhist majority till the 15th century, before the arrival of Islam in this region. Since then, most of the population has converted to Islam. Thus, the presence of Buddhism in this region has now been limited to archeological sites, as the remaining Buddhists of this region moved east to Leh, where Buddhism is the majority religion. The region has many works of graffiti in the ancient Brahmi script written on rocks, produced by Buddhist monks as a form of worship and culture. With most locals converting to Islam, they had been mainly left ignored, destroyed, or forgotten, but are now being restored.

"Hunza was formerly a princely state bordering Xinjiang (autonomous region of China) to the northeast and Pamir to the northwest, which survived until 1974, when it was finally dissolved by Zulfikar Ali Bhutto. The state bordered the Gilgit Agency to the south and the former princely state of Nagar to the east. The state capital was the town of Baltit (also known as Karimabad); another old settlement is Ganish Village which means 'Baba Ganesh village' (a Buddhist name). Hunza was an independent principality for more than 900 years and then in the early 1800s, Hunza played a vital role in the British "Great Game". In 1891 Hunza was captured by the British Empire, and the ruler of Hunza, Mir Safdar Ali Khan, fled to Kashgar, China, and the British army installed his brother Mir Nazim Khan (1892-1938) as a puppet ruler of Hunza Valley, but all orders were passed by British officers who were appointed in the capital Gilgit."

Mir/Tham

According to an account written by John Biddulph in his book Tribes of the Hindoo Koosh:

2010 landslide
The new lake extends  and rose to a depth of  when it was formed as the Hunza River backed up. The landslide completely covered sections of the Karakoram Highway.

Tourism 

Hunza is one of the most exotic places in Pakistan. [1] Several high peaks rise above 7,000 m in the surroundings of Hunza Valley. The valley provides views of several mountains, including:

Rakaposhi 7,788 m (25,551 ft), Ultar Sar 7,388 m (24,239 ft), Bojahagur Duanasir II 7,329 m (24,045 ft), Diran peak (7,266), Spantik (7027m), Ghenta Peak 7,090 m (15,631 ft), Hunza Peak 6,270 m (20,571 ft), Darmyani Peak 6,090 m (19,980 ft), and Bublimating (Ladyfinger Peak) 6,000 m (19,685 ft).

Many 7,000 m mountains are present in Hunza like Distaghil Sar, Batura, Batura II, Batura III, Muchu Chhish, Kunyang Chhish, shispare, Passu Sar, Kanjut Sar, Yukshin Gardan Sar, Pumari Chhish, Momhil Sar and many more.

The fairy-tale-like castle of Baltit, above Karimabad, is a Hunza landmark built about 800 years ago. Stilted on massive legs, its wooden bay windows look out over the valley. Originally, it was used as the residence of the Mirs (the title of the former rulers) of Hunza. [2]

Hunza Valley is also hosting the ancient watchtowers in Ganish, Baltit Fort, and Altit Fort. Watchtowers are located in the heart of Ganish Village. Baltit Fort stands on top of Karimabad, whereas Altit Fort lies at the bottom of the valley. In the 8th century AD, a huge Buddha figure surrounded by small Buddhisatvas was discovered carved on a rock. Pre-historic men and animal figures are carved on rocks along the valley. Some lakes like Attabad Lake, Borith Lake, Shimshal Lakes, Hassanabad Lake are located in Hunza.

Khunjerab Pass is a 4,693-meter-high mountain pass in the Karakoram Mountains. It is in a strategic position on the northern border of Pakistan and on the southwest border of China and is also located in Hunza.

Eco-friendly hiking treks like Ondra Poygah Gulmit and Leopard Trek Shiskhat are also known for their views.

The valley is popularly believed to be the inspiration for the mythical valley of Shangri-La in James Hilton's 1933 novel, Lost Horizon.

One can witness the 57 km long Batura Glacier, the fifth-longest glacier in the world outside the polar region, surrounded by Shispare, Batura, and Kumpirdior peaks. Upon reaching Sost, one can continue the journey up to Khunzhrav or turn west to the Chipursan (also Chapursan) Valley. In Yarzerech (also Yarzirich), one can look at the Kundahill peak (6,000 m), or trek along the Rishepzhurav to the Kundahill. Beyond Yarzerech, one can travel further to Lupghar, Raminj, Reshit, Yishkuk up to Bobo Ghundi (Oston), the shrine of Baba-e-Ghund, a saint from Afghanistan near the border between Pakistan and the Wakhan region of Afghanistan.

2018 rescue mission

Nonetheless, they completed it. Bruce Normand and Timothy Miller from the UK were successfully rescued alive while their companion Christian Huber from Austria had succumbed to avalanche. Britain's High Commissioner Thomas Drew in Pakistan termed the mission "remarkable and dangerous".

People 

The local languages spoken include Burushaski, Wakhi and Shina. The literacy rate of the Hunza valley is more than 95%. The historical area of Hunza and present northern Pakistan has had, over the centuries, mass migrations, conflicts and resettling of tribes and ethnicities, of which the Shina people are the most prominent in regional history. People of the region have recounted their historical traditions down the generations. The Hunza Valley is also home to some Wakhi, who migrated there from northeastern Afghanistan beginning in the nineteenth century onwards.

The longevity of Hunza people has been noted by some, but others refute this as a longevity myth promoted by the lack of birth records. There is no evidence that Hunza life expectancy is significantly above the average of poor, isolated regions of Pakistan. Claims of health and long life were almost always based solely on the statements by the local mir (king). An author who had significant and sustained contact with Burusho people, John Clark, reported that they were overall unhealthy.

However, whether or not their putative longevity is true, it is undoubtable that the Hunza people lead a healthy lifestyle. Many researchers have lived with the Hunza people to answer this mystery including Robert McCarrison who did not discover a single person with diseases such as cancer, stomach ulcers or appendicitis. Furthermore, Henri Coanda spent six decades studying the glacial water in Hunza and discovered possible explanations for the longevity of the Hunza people.

See also 
 State of Hunza (former)
 Hunza District
Nagar District
 Bagrot Valley
 Naltar Valley
 Shamanism in Hunza
 Northern Areas (former)
 Silk Road transmission of Buddhism
 Karakoram Highway
 Karakoram Mountains
 Neelam Valley
 Kalasha Valley
 Kaghan Valley
 Hoper Valley

References

Further reading 
 Kreutzmann, Hermann, Karakoram in Transition: Culture, Development, and Ecology in the Hunza Valley, Oxford University Press, 2006. 
 Leitner, G. W. (1893): Dardistan in 1866, 1886 and 1893: Being An Account of the History, Religions, Customs, Legends, Fables and Songs of Gilgit, Chilas, Kandia (Gabrial) Yasin, Chitral, Hunza, Nagar and other parts of the Hindukush, as also a supplement to the second edition of The Hunza and Nagar Handbook. And An Epitome of Part III of the author's "The Languages and Races of Dardistan". First Reprint 1978. Manjusri Publishing House, New Delhi.
 Lorimer, Lt. Col. D.L.R. Folk Tales of Hunza. 1st edition 1935, Oslo. Three volumes. Vol. II, republished by the Institute of Folk Heritage, Islamabad. 1981.
 Sidkey, M. H. "Shamans and Mountain Spirits in Hunza." Asian Folklore Studies, Vol. 53, No. 1 (1994), pp. 67–96.
 History of Ancient Era Hunza State By Haji Qudratullah Beg English Translation By Lt Col (Rtd) Saadullah Beg, TI(M)
 
 Miller, Katherine, 'Schooling Virtue: Education for 'Spiritual Development' in Megan Adamson Sijapati and Jessica Vantine Birkenholtz, eds., Religion and Modernity in the Himalaya (London: Routledge, 2016).

External links 

 http://emergingpakistan.gov.pk/travel/place-to-visit/gilgit-baltistan/hunza-valley/ 

Valleys of Gilgit-Baltistan
Hunza
History of Gilgit Agency
Hindu Kush
Himalayas
Regions of Pakistan
Landslides in 2010
Valleys of Pakistan